The 1852 United States presidential election in Ohio was held on November 2, 1852 as part of the 1852 United States presidential election. State voters chose 23 electors to the Electoral College, who voted for President and Vice President.

Ohio was narrowly won by the Democratic Party candidate, Franklin Pierce, who won the state with a plurality of 47.83 percent of the popular vote. The Whig Party candidate, Winfield Scott, garnered 43.18 percent of the popular vote, and Free Soil Party candidate John P. Hale gained 8.98 percent, a figure exceeded by a third-party candidate in Ohio only six times since.

Pierce would become the final Democrat to win Ohio until Woodrow Wilson won it in 1912.

Results

See also
 United States presidential elections in Ohio

Notes

References

Ohio
1852
1852 Ohio elections